The Northeast Flag Replacement refers to Zhang Xueliang's announcement on 29 December 1928 that all banners of the Beiyang government in Manchuria would be replaced with the flag of the Nationalist government, thus nominally uniting China under one government.

Origin
In April 1928, Chiang Kai-shek was reinstated as commander of the National Revolutionary Army, the position he previously resigned from after taking responsibility for splitting the KMT during the First Northern Expedition. He proceeded with the Second Northern Expedition and was approaching Beijing near the end of May. The Beiyang government in Beijing was forced to dissolve as a result; Zhang Zuolin abandoned Beijing to return to Manchuria and was assassinated in the Huanggutun incident by the Japanese Kwantung Army. However, Manchuria was still held by the Fengtian clique, which hung the banner of the Beiyang government. The ultimate objective of the Northern Expedition was not fully accomplished.

Process

Immediately after the death of Zhang Zuolin, Zhang Xueliang returned to Shenyang to succeed his father's position. On July 1 he announced an armistice with the National Revolutionary Army and proclaimed that he would not interfere with the reunification.  The Japanese were dissatisfied with the move and demanded Zhang to proclaim the independence of Manchuria. He refused the Japanese demand and proceeded with unification matters. On July 3 Chiang Kai-shek arrived in Beijing and met the representative from the Fengtian clique to discuss a peaceful settlement. This negotiation reflected the scramble between the US and Japan on her sphere of influence in China because the US supported Chiang Kai-shek unifying Manchuria. Under pressure from the US and Britain, Japan was diplomatically isolated on this issue. On December 29 Zhang Xueliang announced the replacement of all flags in Manchuria and accepted the jurisdiction of the Nationalist government.  Two days later the Nationalist government appointed Zhang as commander of the Northeast Army. China was symbolically reunified at this point.

See also 
 Warlord era
 Northern Expedition
 1928 in China
 Jinan incident (May 1928)
 Huanggutun incident (Japanese assassination of the Chinese head of state Generalissimo Zhang Zuolin on 4 June 1928)
 Japanese invasion of Manchuria
 Mukden Incident (18 September 1931)

References 

1928 in China
History of Manchuria
National unifications
Warlord Era